The Socotra cisticola (Cisticola haesitatus) or island cisticola, is a species of bird in the family Cisticolidae.
It is endemic to Socotra Island in the Arabian Sea.

Its natural habitats are subtropical or tropical dry shrubland and subtropical or tropical high-altitude grassland. It is threatened by habitat loss.

References

Socotra cisticola
Endemic birds of Socotra
Socotra cisticola
Socotra cisticola
Taxonomy articles created by Polbot